Scopula vitellina is a moth of the  family Geometridae. It is found in Cameroon.

References

Moths described in 1978
vitellina
Moths of Africa